Fabienne Kocher (born 13 June 1993) is a Swiss judoka. She won one of the bronze medals in the women's 52 kg event at the 2021 World Judo Championships held in Budapest, Hungary. She also represented Switzerland at the 2020 Summer Olympics in Tokyo, Japan.

Career
She previously competed at the World Judo Championships in 2014 and 2015 in the women's 57 kg event and in 2018 and 2019 in the women's 52 kg event. She also competed in the women's 52 kg event at the European Judo Championships in 2020 and 2021.

In 2019, she represented Switzerland in the women's 52 kg event at the European Games held in Minsk, Belarus. She was eliminated in her second match by Majlinda Kelmendi of Kosovo.

In 2021, she lost her bronze medal match in the women's 52 kg event at the 2020 Summer Olympics in Tokyo, Japan.

She won one of the bronze medals in her event at the 2022 Judo Grand Prix Almada held in Almada, Portugal. She also won one of the bronze medals in her event at the 2022 Judo Grand Slam Paris held in Paris, France.

Achievements

Awards

In March 2022, she won the Aargau Sportswoman of the Year award.

References

External links
 

Living people
1993 births
Place of birth missing (living people)
Swiss female judoka
Judoka at the 2019 European Games
European Games competitors for Switzerland
Judoka at the 2020 Summer Olympics
Olympic judoka of Switzerland
20th-century Swiss women
21st-century Swiss women